Damul is a 1985 Hindi film directed by Prakash Jha, based on the story Kaalsootra, by Shaiwal, a native of Gaya district of Bihar., starring Annu Kapoor, Sreela Majumdar, Manohar Singh, Deepti Naval, Ranjan Kamath and Pyare Mohan Sahay in lead roles.

Plot
The story is about a bonded labourer who is forced to steal for his landlord, to whom he is bonded until death. Set in rural Bihar of 1984, the film focuses on the caste politics and the oppression of the lower castes in the region, through bonded labour. The film also highlights the issue of heavy migration of the poor villagers of Bihar to richer states like Punjab in search of livelihood.

Awards
 1984: National Film Award for Best Feature Film
 1985: Filmfare Critics Award for Best Movie

International acclaim
Damul was invited for both the competition and participation sections at the Montreal, Chicago and Moscow film festivals.

References

External links
 
 Damul at Prakash Jha Productions 
 Prakash Jha's Homepage

1985 films
Films directed by Prakash Jha
1980s Hindi-language films
Films set in Bihar
Best Feature Film National Film Award winners